Thomas Todd (January 23, 1765 – February 7, 1826) was an Associate Justice of the Supreme Court of the United States from 1807 to 1826. Raised in the Colony of Virginia, he studied law and later participated in the founding of Kentucky, where he served as a clerk, judge, and justice. He was married twice and had a total of eight children. Todd joined the U.S. Supreme Court in 1807 and his handful of legal opinions there mostly concerned land claims. He was labeled the most insignificant U.S. Supreme Court justice by Frank H. Easterbrook in The Most Insignificant Justice: Further Evidence, 50 U. Chi. L. Rev. 481 (1983).

Early life and education

Todd was born to the former Elizabeth Richards and her husband, Richard Todd in King and Queen County, Virginia, on January 23, 1765. He was the youngest of five children, all orphaned when Thomas was a boy. He was raised Presbyterian, but because Virginia lacked public schools at the time, had difficulty obtaining an education.

At the age of 16, Todd joined the Continental Army as a private with a company of cavalry from Manchester, Virginia in final months of the American Revolutionary War. Upon returning home, he attended Liberty Hall Academy (now Washington and Lee University) in Lexington, Virginia, and graduated in 1783.

Todd then became a tutor at Liberty Hall Academy (which later became Washington & Lee University) in exchange for room and board, and graduated at age 18, in 1783. Todd lived with the family of his cousin, Judge  Harry Innes in Bedford County, Virginia and also studied surveying before moving to Kentucky County (then part of Virginia) with the Innes family when Harry Innes was appointed to the Kentucky district of the Virginia Supreme Court. Todd tutored his cousin's children in Danville, Kentucky in exchange for help in reading law.

Career in Kentucky
Todd was admitted to the Kentucky bar in 1786, and maintained a private practice in Danville, Kentucky from 1788 until 1801. He also gained influence by becoming its court reporter and served as secretary to the Kentucky State Legislature after statehood. Before that event, Todd served as the secretary to ten conventions between 1784 and 1792 which advocated formation of the state of Kentucky, and which later wrote its state constitution. Todd also served as one of Lincoln County's two delegates to the Virginia House of Delegates in the term which ended in Kentucky's statehood.

Todd was also the first clerk of the Kentucky Court of Appeals (on which he would in 1801 begin sit as one of its judges and beginning in 1806 as its chief judge). Todd also owned slaves, twenty-six slaves at the time of the 1820 census.

Marriages

Todd married Elizabeth Harris in 1788. They had five children: Millicent, Charles Stewart Todd (1791–1871; whom his father sent back to Virginia for education at the College of William and Mary, then tutored in law), John Harris Todd (1795–1824), Ann Maria (1801–1862) and Elizabeth Frances (1808–1892).

On March 29, 1812, two years after his first wife died, Todd married Lucy Payne Washington, the youngest sister of Dolley Madison and the widow of Major George Steptoe Washington, who was a nephew of President George Washington. It is believed to be the first wedding held in the White House. Their children were: James Madison (1817–1897), William J. and Madisonia.

Supreme Court justice

On February 28, 1807, President Thomas Jefferson nominated Todd as an associate justice of the Supreme Court, after the number of seats on the Court was expanded from six to seven by Congress. The United States Senate confirmed the appointment on March 2, 1807, and Todd was sworn into office on May 4, 1807.

Todd served under Chief Justice John Marshall. As justice responsible for the circuit including Kentucky, Tennessee and Ohio, Todd convened court twice a year each in Nashville, Frankfort and Chillicothe, and spent the six winter months in Washington, D.C.

He is one of 19 Presbyterians to have served on the Court. He served on the Court until February 7, 1826.

Court opinions

Politically, Todd was a Jeffersonian. Although they had different political beliefs, Todd adopted Marshall's views on judicial interpretation, but did not write a single constitutional opinion. Todd wrote only fourteen opinions—eleven majority, two concurring and one dissenting. Ten of his eleven majority opinions involved disputed land and survey claims.

Todd's first reported opinion was a dissent to the opinion of Chief Justice Marshall in Finley v. Lynn. He concurred in all other opinions written by the chief justice. One of the more interesting of these cases was Preston v. Browder, in which the court upheld the right of North Carolina to make land claim restrictions on filings that were made in Indian territory and that violated the Treaty of the Long Island of Holston made by the state on July 20, 1777. His opinion in Watts v. Lindsey's Heirs et al., explained confusing and complicated land title problems which plagued early settlers of Kentucky.

Todd's only Court opinion that did not involve land law was his last. In Riggs v. Taylor, the court made the important procedural ruling, now taken for granted, that if a party intends to use a document as evidence, then the original must be produced. However, if the original is in the possession of the other party to the suit, and that party refuses to produce it, or if the original is lost or destroyed, then secondary evidence will be admitted.

Death, estate and legacy

Todd died in Frankfort, Kentucky on February 7, 1826, at the age of 61. He was initially buried in the Innes family cemetery. Later, his remains were removed to Frankfort Cemetery, overlooking the Kentucky River and the Kentucky State Capitol.

At the time of his death, Todd owned substantial real property, particularly in Frankfort. He was a charter member of the Kentucky River Company, the first business formed to promote Kentucky waterway navigation. The inventory of his estate revealed he was a shareholder of the Kentucky Turnpike, the first publicly improved highway west of the Alleghenies, and the Frankfort toll bridge, crossing the Kentucky River. After his children were provided for, as he put it, in "their full proportion", the remainder of his estate valued at more than $70,000—a large sum at the time.

Todd's papers are kept in three locations: 
Cincinnati Historical Society, Cincinnati, Ohio.
The Filson Historical Society, Louisville, Kentucky.
University of Kentucky, Margaret I. King Library, Lexington, Kentucky.

During World War II the Liberty ship  was built in Brunswick, Georgia, and named in his honor.

Memberships and other honors
Todd became a member of the American Antiquarian Society in 1820. He was also a Freemason.

See also
 List of justices of the Supreme Court of the United States
 Marshall Court
 United States Supreme Court cases during the Marshall Court

References

Sources
 Oyez Project, Supreme Court Media, Thomas Todd
 The Adherents, Religious Affiliation of Supreme Court Justices.
 https://www.law.cornell.edu/supct/justices/histBio.html#todd
 Biography and Bibliography, Thomas Todd, 6th Circuit United States Court of Appeals.

Further reading

 
 
 Flanders, Henry. The Lives and Times of the Chief Justices of the United States Supreme Court. Philadelphia: J. B. Lippincott & Co., 1874 at Google Books.
 
 
 
 
 White, G. Edward. The Marshall Court & Cultural Change, 1815–35. Published in an abridged edition, 1991.

|-

|-

1765 births
1826 deaths
19th-century American judges
American Presbyterians
Burials at Frankfort Cemetery
Judges of the Kentucky Court of Appeals
Kentucky Democratic-Republicans
Kentucky lawyers
Members of the American Antiquarian Society
People from King and Queen County, Virginia
People of Kentucky in the American Revolution
Politicians from Danville, Kentucky
United States federal judges appointed by Thomas Jefferson
Justices of the Supreme Court of the United States
Virginia lawyers
Washington and Lee University alumni
Washington and Lee University faculty
United States federal judges admitted to the practice of law by reading law
American slave owners